Be There may refer to:

 "Be There" (Howie Day song), 2009
 "Be There" (B'z song), 1990
 "Be There" (Unkle song), 1999
 "Be There", by iamnot, 2017
 Be There (AB6IX song), 2019